Finedon Dolben Cricket Club is an amateur cricket club based in Finedon, Northamptonshire, England. Finedon Dolben have 4 senior XI teams in the Northamptonshire Cricket League, and an established Junior Section, who play in both the Higham & District Youth League and the Corby and District Youth Cricket League

Club history 
Finedon Dolben Cricket Club was founded in 1836 and records show that they joined the Kettering & District Cricket League in 1896. After many years of league activity, resulting in numerous championship title wins, Finedon Dolben became a member of the Northamptonshire Cricket League. Since the Northamptonshire Cricket League was designated an ECB Premier League in 1999, Finedon Dolben is one of only three cricket clubs (Finedon Dolben, Old Northamptonians and Peterborough Town) to have held a constant presence in the highest level of competition for recreational club cricket in Northamptonshire, with eleven ECB Premiership league championship titles to their name.

Club Performance
The Northamptonshire Cricket League competition results showing the club's positions in the league (by Division) since 1999.

Source:

Club Honours

Source:

References

External links 
 Finedon Dolben CC 1st XI in front of the thatched pavilion (1904)
 Finedon Dolben CC 1st XI posing for a photograph at Obelisk House after winning the Kettering and District League trophy (1931)
 Play Cricket

English club cricket teams
Cricket in Northamptonshire